Kuroshiodaphne subula is a species of sea snail, a marine gastropod mollusc in the family Raphitomidae.

Description
The length of the shell attains 15 mm.

The shell is closely reticulated with longitudinal and revolving lines, with a flatly obtuse keel near the suture. The lip-sinus is distinct. The shell is yellowish white, painted with chestnut spots around the suture.

Distribution
This marine species occurs off the Philippines and Taiwan

References

External links
 Gastropods.com: Kuroshiodaphne subula
 

subula
Gastropods described in 1845